Malay was launched in Greenock in 1818. She sailed between Greenock and either North America or the West Indies. She was wrecked in November 1831.

Career
Malay first appeared in Lloyd's Register (LR) in 1818.

At 3am on 23 May 1819 a fire broke out on Malay as she had begun a voyage from Greenock to Jamaica, but her crew was able to work her into the Greenock Roads. Within three hours they were able to put out the fire, which had run along the deck. The water used to put out the fire badly damaged her cargo.

In 1830 Malay brought 261 settlers to Canada from Tobermory. On 28 August she delivered 211 to Sydney, Nova Scotia; then on 10 September she reached Quebec City, where she delivered 50 more.

Fate
Malay was lost on 1 November 1831 on Basque Island , "below Green Island". She was on a voyage from Liverpool to Quebec City. Her crew was saved. Her whole cargo was expected to be saved, but in a very damaged state.

Citations

1818 ships
Age of Sail merchant ships of England
Maritime incidents in 1819
Maritime incidents in November 1831
Migrant ships to Canada